National Legislators' Conference Bharat (NLC Bharat) is the first and largest conference of Legislators in India aimed at extending their role to propagate the ideals of democracy at national and international levels. NLC Bharat was conceptualized in Pune, Maharashtra on 16 September 2022. The conference will take place over the course of four days, 15th to 18th June 2023.

Objective 
NLC Bharat (National Legislators' Conference Bharat) is to bring together elected officials from across all States and union territories of India to engage in meaningful discussions and exchange of ideas. This conference provides a platform for roundtable discussions between legislators on various issues and encourages the sharing of innovative solutions for good governance and strengthening the democratic fabric.

The NLC Bharat serves as a democracy carnival, promoting the ethos of Bharat's democracy to the world. It features workshops, conferences, and seminars that provide a forum for legislators to discuss important democratic and developmental issues. The conference also provides a unique opportunity for lawmakers to interact, debate, and share individual challenges and aspirations, promoting unity and democratic values among them.

The NLC Bharat is an initiative of the MIT School of Government (MIT-SOG), which was established by Rahul V Karad in 2005 to provide political training to aspiring young politicians. The NLC Bharat is the result of the collective vision of former Speakers of the Lok Sabha and incumbent Speakers of State Legislative Assemblies and Chairpersons of State Legislative Councils.

In conclusion, the NLC Bharat provides a space for peer learning and knowledge sharing, and enables lawmakers to come together to promote the democratic values of participation, transparency, good governance, and unity in diversity.

Organizing Committee 
The Committee at National Legislators’ Conference Bharat has reputed personalities.

 Raghunath Anant Mashelkar, chairman and Renowned Scientist
 Vijay P. Bhatkar, Eminent Computer Scientist
 Prof. Dr. Vishwanath Karad, Founder President MAEER
 Lobsang Sangay, President, Central Tibetan Administration (CTA)
 Rahul V Karad, Executive President, MIT - WPU
 Mark Tully, Former Bureau Chief of BBC, New Delhi
 Abhay Firodia, chairman, Force Motors
 Dr. Narendra Jadhav, Former Member, Rajya Sabha
 Jaya Prakash Narayana, Founder, Lok Satta

Sessions Proposed

See also 

 NLC India Limited
 विश्वनाथ कराड

References 

Companies based in Pune
Political organisations based in India
2022 establishments in India
Organisations based in Pune
Organizations established in 2022
India
India
International conferences in India